Children of the Partisan is a 1954 Soviet drama film directed by Nikolai Figurovsky and Lev Golub.

Plot 
The young suvorovts Mihas, whose father died in the war, visits his grandfather - the forester Yakub. Together with their set, they trample down the territories on which partisans fought with the Germans, while the explorer base, located near them, is inhabited by the conductor Glushko, who must take pictures of secret maps.

Starring 
 Viktor Komissarov as young partisan Mihas
 Natalya Zashchipina	
 Pavel Volkov	
 Pavel Molchanov
 L. Mozolevskaya
 Oleg Zhakov
 Pavel Shpringfeld	
 Grigoriy Shpigel	
 Ekaterina Savinova	
 Vladimir Balashov	
 L. Timofeyeva	
 Ya. Zashtoft	
 Yu. Pashkin
 Ye. Buzuk
 V. Marsikov	
 G. Sudnik

References

External links 
 

1954 films
1950s Russian-language films
Soviet drama films
1954 drama films